This is a discography of releases from the Australian experimental band Severed Heads. Since their creation in 1979, the group has released 23 studio albums, 1 split album, 14 compilation albums, 1 soundtrack, 3 extended plays, 14 singles, and 8 home video releases. The group's 1984 single "Dead Eyes Opened" (from their 1983 album Since the Accident)  peaked at number 16 on the Australian ARIA Charts when remixed and re-issued in 1994, and singles from their 1989 album Rotund for Success, "Greater Reward" and "All Saints Day", both charted on Billboards Top Dance Tracks charts at numbers 19 and 25, respectively.

In 2008, Tom Ellard announced that the Severed Heads project has dissolved, however the group has done reunion tours since 2011.

Albums

Studio albums

Compilation albums

Soundtrack albums

Video albums

Extended plays

Singles

References

External links
 Severed Heads official discography
 Severed Heads discography at Discogs

Discographies of Australian artists
Rock music group discographies